Sheykhiabad-e Olya (also Romanized as Sheykhīābād-e ‘Olyā; also known as Sheykhābād-e ‘Olyā and Sheykhīābād-e Bālā) is a village in Hojr Rural District, in the Central District of Sahneh County, Kermanshah Province, Iran. At the 2006 census, its population was 201, in 41 families.

References 

Populated places in Sahneh County